The C2-class trams  are five-section Alstom Citadis 302 trams built in La Rochelle, France that operate on the Melbourne tram network. They were built for the tram network in Mulhouse, France, but being surplus to Mulhouse demands, were leased to use in Melbourne in 2008, later being purchased by the Government of Victoria. The trams operate solely on route 96.

History

In 2008 an arrangement to lease five low-floor, air-conditioned, bi-directional, five section Alstom Citadis 302 trams was brokered with Mulhouse, France, through Yarra Trams' then French parent, Transdev. The lease agreement was $9 million for four years with shipping costs of $500,000 for each tram, with the first tram arriving in Melbourne in February 2008. The first tram was launched on 11 June 2008, nicknamed Bumble Bee 1, with the rest following suit up to Bumble Bee 5; all entered service on route 96.

Being surplus to the demands of Mulhouse, they were originally intended to be leased only until December 2011. However, it was announced in November 2010 that the State Government was in negotiations to acquire the C2-trams, with all five subsequently purchased in 2012/13.

Prior to entering service in Melbourne they had minor adjustments made at Preston Workshops, including improvements to the air-conditioning and modifications to the Mulhouse livery.

Operation
C2-class trams operate on the following route:
96: Brunswick East to St Kilda Beach

References

External links

Alstom trams
Articulated passenger trains
Melbourne tram vehicles
Alstom multiple units
600 V DC multiple units